Matthew Davidson is an American guitarist, singer and songwriter originally from Shreveport, Louisiana and now based in Nashville, TN. He is currently touring with Travis Denning. He has performed at the Grand Ole Opry, on Today with Hoda and Jenna, and on Broadway in downtown Nashville at venues such as Dierks Whiskey Row, The Stage, Legends Corner, Second Fiddle, Jason Aldean's, and Luke Bryan's 32 Bridge. He graduated in 2020 from Belmont University with a Bachelor of Music in Commercial Guitar. Matthew has played guitar for supporting artists opening for Walker Hayes and Willie Nelson.

Awards and experience

Matthew was the winner of the 2011 Robert Johnson Blues Foundation/Gibson Guitar New Generation Award. Matthew's debut EP "Step Up" was released in 2012 and produced by bassist Joe Osborn.  It was followed by his 2014 EP "Cross My Heart". Matthew was nominated for "2012 Best Emerging Artist" by OffBeat (music magazine) in New Orleans in their annual "Best of the Beat" Awards. 

Matthew performed as a guest soloist with The Shreveport Symphony Orchestra in May, 2015. Matthew’s original song “Read My Mind” was selected as a semi-finalist in the 2014 International Songwriting Competition.

Matthew and his band opened for Austin Mahone in 2014,  Fifth Harmony in 2015 and Rachel Platten in 2016.

Photographer Robert M. Knight invited Matthew to join “The Brotherhood of the Guitar” (BOTG). The BOTG is a project launched by Knight and sponsored by Ernie Ball. The BOTG’s purpose is to shine a spotlight on a select group of unsigned up-and-coming young guitar players from around the world. Matthew was the featured BOTG member in the Sept. 2013 issue of "At:Guitar Center" magazine.

Matthew was selected by The Grammy Foundation to attend both 2014 and 2015 Grammy Camp in Nashville, TN hosted by Belmont University. The camp offered high school students a week-long immersive music experience, focusing on all aspects of commercial music and taught by industry professionals Applicants were selected based on submissions of performance and interview videos.

In 2013, he placed in the Top 10 in an international guitar contest sponsored by Capitol Records and The Beach Boys.

Matthew won his first electric guitar in the 2007 James Burton Guitar Showdown.  He was the youngest of eight student guitarists selected to play with Kenny Wayne Shepherd at his 2009 Artbreak Concert. He has played at the B.B. King Museum and the B.B. King Homecoming Concert in Indianola, MS and the Delta Blues Fest in Greenville, MS, where in addition to his own set, he sat in with Honeyboy Edwards for a few songs. Matthew has played at the Pinetop Perkins Homecoming Celebration and the famous Ground Zero (blues club) in Clarksdale, MS. Matthew performed at the Dallas International Guitar Festival and in the Youth Showcase at the 2011 International Blues Challenge in Memphis, TN, jamming at the B. B. King Blues Club while he was there. Other venues where Matthew has performed are The Strand Theatre (Shreveport, Louisiana), Temple Theater (Meridian, Mississippi), The Ellis Marsalis Center in the Musicians' Village, New Orleans Mint in New Orleans, LA and the Shreveport Municipal Memorial Auditorium, home of the famed Louisiana Hayride. In 2013, Matthew was invited to join Kenny Wayne Shepherd on stage at the 59Twenty Music Festival in Meridian, MS.

Matthew was selected out of several hundred applicants to be the guitarist for the 2011 Kidd Kraddick Rock Camp Band. As part of this camp, Matthew had the opportunity to perform live on the air on the nationally syndicated radio show "Kidd Kraddick in the Morning".

Matthew has had the honor of sharing the stage with Joe Osborn, Jerry Beach, Brady Blade, and Patrick Stump from Fall Out Boy.
Matthew's musical taste was largely acquired from listening to his dad's CD collection of music by The Beatles, Eric Clapton, Stevie Ray Vaughan, John Mayer and Creedence Clearwater Revival.

Early career performances

The Matthew Davidson Band made their debut on June 25, 2010. They played at The James Burton International Guitar Festival, the State Fair of Louisiana, Independence Stadium, the Krewe of Centaur Parade, the Natchitoches Jazz/R&B Festival, Holiday in Dixie, AlleyFest in Longview, TX, Fort Worth Mayfest, Grapefest in Grapevine, TX, The T-Bone Walker Blues Fest in Linden, TX, Crossroads Music Company in Winnsboro, TX and the KTBS 3 Independence Day Festival. They were honored to be selected as the Grand Marshals of the Krewe of Aesclepius Mardi Gras Parade. The Matthew Davidson Band performed at the Dallas House of Blues, the Hard Rock Cafe in Dallas, on Red River Radio and headlined the Mississippi Blues Marathon in Jackson, MS. They performed at the 2011 King Biscuit Blues Festival in Helena, AR, the 2012 New Orleans Jazz & Heritage Festival, the 2012 Natchitoches Christmas Festival, the 2013 Baton Rouge FestForAll and the 2013 Louisiana Seafood Festival in New Orleans.

Independent albums

References 

 "Starting Small Music Podcast - Matthew Davidson: Guitarist for Travis Denning" - April 15,2022
 "Davidson Plays Guitar for Travis Denning's Performance on Today with Hoda and Jenna" -  Belmont University News - March 11,2020
 "Former Fleetwood Mac Member Bob Welch Celebrated in Musicians Hall of Fame Exhibit" -  Belmont University News - August 27,2018
 "Young Entrepreneur Spotlight: Matthew Davidson" -  National Federation of Independent Business - August 30,2016
 "Love for music leads to scholarship for local student" - Kevin Connelly, The Shreveport Times - April 26,2016
 "Radio Segment Congratulating Matthew for opening for Fifth Harmony" - K945.com by Jay Whatley - July 27,2015
 "Shreveporter Matthew Davidson Opened for Fifth Harmony" - K945.com by Jay Whatley - July 27,2015
 "What Makes a Prodigy?" - The Shreveport Times  - February 26,2015
 "A Good Pick" - The Forum News  - August 20,2014
 "Shreveport's Matthew Davidson Opened for Austin Mahone" - Jay Whatley, K94.5  - July 14,2014
 "Students Learn the Music Industry at Grammy Camp" - News Channel 5 (Nashville, TN) - June 11,2014
 "Matthew Davidson - "Cross My Heart" review - Offbeat Magazine - June 1,2014
 "Matthew Davidson - "Cross My Heart" 2014" - Something Else Reviews - May 14,2014
 "Shreveport Band to Rock AlleyFest" - The Longview News-Journal - May 8,2014
 "Matthew Davidson Impresses with Cross My Heart" - Derick Jones, The Shreveport Times - April 23,2014
 "Louisiana's 16 year-old guitar slinger, Matthew Davidson, is a Heartbreaker" - Robert Trudeau, Heliopolis - April 16,2014
 "Mom-a-gers: The Guitar Hero" - Stephanie Jordan, City Life Magazine - April 1,2014
 "5 Things You Didn't Know about Matthew Davidson" - Justin Massoud, K94.5 - March 4,2014
 "One Track Mind: Matthew Davidson "Heartbreaker" 2013" - Nick DeRiso, Something Else Reviews - Oct.27,2013
 "Popular Band is Back Again for Second Saturday" - Marshall News-Messenger - Sept.14, 2013
 "Shreveport's Matthew Davidson Featured in Guitar Center, Releases New Single" - K945 - Sept.4, 2013
 "Matthew Davidson Visits Seacrest Studios" - Children's Medical Center Dallas - July 19, 2013
 "Matthew Davidson Invited to Join Brotherhood of the Guitar" - American Blues Scene - April 30, 2013
 "Entertainment Reporter Interviews Matthew Davidson and Robert Knight" - Jabari Thomas KSLA(CBS) - April 30, 2013
 "Shreveport's Own Matthew Davidson in Robert Knight's Eye" - K94.5 - April 26, 2013
 "Matthew Davidson Interview and Performance" - KPXJ/KTBS Interview - April 23, 2013
 "Shreveport teen making name for himself in music" - John Wirt,The Baton Rouge Advocate - April 5, 2013
 "Matthew Davidson Invited to Join 'Brotherhood of the Guitar'" - The Shreveport Times - April 2, 2013
 "Sucarnochee Revue to record live in Livingston" - The Demopolis Times - January 30, 2013
 "Robert Johnson Blues Foundation Award Recipient Matthew Davidson Talks About the Blues" - William Clark - Guitar International - January 9, 2013
 "Music Review-Matthew Davidson-Step Up" - Alex V. Cook - Offbeat Magazine - January, 2013
 "Matthew Davidson at Northwest LA Veterans Home on Christmas Eve" - KTAL News Channel 6 - Dec. 24, 2012 
 "Prodigies Will Play at 'Turn on the Lights'" - Amanda Franko-Tobin - The Natchitoches Times - Nov. 16, 2012
 "Album Review - Matthew Davidson's Step Up" - Annie Reuter - You Sing I Write - Oct. 9, 2012
 "Music Notes - October" - County Line Magazine - Sept. 28, 2012
 "10:01 Spotlight - Matthew Davidson Steps Up" - Bill Beckett - Red River Radio - Sept. 28, 2012
 "Teen Energy: Matthew Davidson Band" - Robert Trudeau - Shreveport Blog - Sept. 23, 2012
 "Matthew Davidson Releases "Step Up" EP, featuring Joe Osborn" - NoTreble.com - Sept. 13, 2012
 "Teen Guitar Prodigy Steps Up with Debut Recording" - PRWeb.com - Sept. 6, 2012
 "Living The Dream - Rock n Roll Style" - Derick Jones, The Shreveport Times - Aug.17, 2012
 "Interview with Matthew Davidson and Joe Osborn" - Talk of the Town with Tom Pace - July 28, 2012
 "Cities in Blue - Texas" - Canadian Television Program - 2012
 "Shreveport’s Own Matthew Davidson Band Rocks Jazz Fest" - K94.5 - May 10, 2012
 "Matthew Davidson Band to give New Orleans Jazz Fest the blues and rock it too" - New Orleans Times-Picayune (NOLA.com) - May 4, 2012
 "Teen bluesman Matthew Davidson to close Kids Tent at New Orleans Jazz Fest Saturday" - New Orleans Times-Picayune (NOLA.com) - May 4, 2012
 "Guitar Prodigy - Humble & Hip" - SB  Magazine - May, 2012
 "Blues musician Matthew Davidson to perform Saturday" -Marshall News Messenger - Apr. 12, 2012
 "Matthew Davidson is THE Man - Blue Star Connection Donates Instruments to Sutton Children's Hospital" -K945.com - Mar. 16, 2012
 "Shreveport Teen Wins Robert Johnson New Generation Award" -The Shreveport Times - Jan. 5, 2012
 "2011 New Generation Award Winner" - Robert Johnson Blues Foundation website
 "Teen Guitarist Matthew Davidson Wins Robert Johnson Award" - American Blues Scene - Jan. 5, 2012
 "Award winners headline Music City Texas Theatre Blues Night" Longview News Journal - Jan. 6, 2012
 2011 Kidd Kraddick Rock Camp Band - Breaking Even on "Good Morning, Texas", Aug. 17, 2011
 Kidd Kraddick Presents the Third Rock Camp - AllAccess.com - July 27, 2011
 Interview with Matthew Davidson at Kidd Kraddick Rock Camp - July, 2011
 KTBS 3 Interview promoting Matthew's appearance at the KTBS Independence Day Festival - July 3, 2011
 "Get Ready East Texas for The Matthew Davidson Band" Piney Woods Live - June, 2011
 "13 Year Old Blues Man Matthew Davidson" American Blues Scene May, 2011
 KTBS coverage of The Matthew Davidson Band in the Krewe of Centaur Mardi Gras parade - Feb., 2011
 "Interview with The Matthew Davidson Band" KTBS 3 - Oct. 10, 2010
 "Interview with Matthew Davidson at the Delta Blues Fest" Greenville, MS - Sept. 18, 2010

External links 
 Matthew Davidson's website 
 Matthew Davidson's Facebook page 
 Matthew Davidson's Instagram page 
 Matthew Davidson's Twitter page 
 Matthew Davidson's YouTube channel 

1998 births
Living people
Guitarists from Louisiana
Musicians from Shreveport, Louisiana
21st-century American guitarists